Horng-Tzer Yau (born 1959 in Taiwan) is a Taiwanese-American mathematician. He received his B.Sc. in 1981 from National Taiwan University and his Ph.D. in 1987 from Princeton University. Yau joined the faculty of NYU in 1988, and became a full professor at its Courant Institute of Mathematical Sciences in 1994. He moved to Stanford in 2003, and then to Harvard University in 2005. He was also a member of the Institute for Advanced Study in Princeton, New Jersey, in 1987–88, 1991–92, and 2003, and was a distinguished visiting professor in 2013–14.
 
According to William C. Kirby,  dean of the Faculty of Arts and Sciences at Harvard, "Professor Yau is a leader in the fields of mathematical physics,  ...  who has introduced important tools and concepts to study probability, stochastic processes, nonequilibrium statistical physics, and quantum dynamics."

Yau is a 2000 MacArthur Fellow.

Honors
 Simons Investigator Award 
 Sloan Foundation Fellowship
 Packard Foundation Fellowship, 1991
 International Congress of Mathematicians, 1998
 Henri Poincaré Prize, 2000
 MacArthur Fellowship, 2000
 Morningside Gold Medal of Mathematics, 2001 
 Academician of the Academia Sinica, 2002
 Member of the American Academy of Arts and Sciences 
 Member of the National Academy of Sciences 
 Fellow of the American Mathematical Society, 2012
 Simons Investigator, 2012
 Editor-in-Chief of Communications in Mathematical Physics
 the 2017 Eisenbud Prize for Mathematics & Physics

References

External links
 "Yau Travels Down The Road Less Taken," from the Harvard Gazette — archived at the Wayback Machine
 Seminar at Isaac Newton Institute

1959 births
Living people
20th-century American mathematicians
21st-century American mathematicians
Mathematical physicists
Taiwanese emigrants to the United States
Princeton University alumni
Courant Institute of Mathematical Sciences faculty
Stanford University faculty
Harvard University faculty
MacArthur Fellows
Fellows of the American Mathematical Society
Simons Investigator
20th-century Taiwanese mathematicians
20th-century Taiwanese physicists
Members of Academia Sinica
Members of the United States National Academy of Sciences